Dame is a surname. Notable people with the surname include:

Edmond Dame (1893–1956), French sport wrestler
Enid Dame (1943–2003), American poet and writer
Gilman M. Dame, American politician
Harriet Patience Dame (1815–1900), American Civil War nurse
Harry A. Dame (1878–1933), American football player and coach
Napoleon Dame (1913–2006), Canadian ice hockey player
Pierrette Dame (born 1936), French archer
Tom Dame, American astronomer
William H. Dame (1819–1884), American politician

See also
Olivier Dame-Malka (born 1990), Canadian-born French ice hockey player
Dames (surname)